Dolní Lukavice is a municipality and village in Plzeň-South District in the Plzeň Region of the Czech Republic. It has about 1,100 inhabitants.

Administrative parts
Villages of Krasavce, Lišice and Snopoušovy are administrative parts of Dolní Lukavice.

Geography

It lies on the border between the Plasy Uplands and Švihov Highlands. The Úhlava River flows through the municipality.

History

The first written mention of Dolní Lukavice is from 1216. From the mid-15th century until 1596, the village was in possession of the Lukavský of Řenče family. The most notable owners of Dolní Lukavice was the Morzin Family, who bought it in 1666. They had the old local fortress demolished and had a new  Baroque castle built. They held the estate until 1780, when Karl Joseph, Count Morzin sold it to Count Karel Bedřich of Hatzfeld.

During the mid-18th century, the Morzin family was very musical, and in 1759 they hired the young composer Joseph Haydn to serve as their Kapellmeister (music director), leading the family's small orchestra. Haydn followed the Morzins back and forth in their annual migrations: summers in Dolní Lukavice (referred to as "Lukavec" in most Haydn biographies), and winters in the imperial capital of Vienna.

Sights
Dolní Lukavice is known for the Dolní Lukavice Castle (also called Morzin Palace). It was built according to design of Jakub Auguston in 1707–1728. It is surounded by a large English park. Today the palace is in poor condition and empty.

The Church of Saints Peter and Paul was built in the early Gothic style around 1340 and first documented in 1352. In the second half of the 15th century, late Gothic modifications were made, and in 1722, the church was baroque rebuilt probably by Jakub Auguston.

Notes

References

External links

Villages in Plzeň-South District
Morzin family
Joseph Haydn